Élise Pottier, better known by her stage name Berry, is a French singer, originally a theatre actress. Her mother is the singer-songwriter Christine Authier.

Berry's first album, Mademoiselle, was released in 2008. The album reached No. 34 in France and No. 46 in Belgium. A second album titled "Les passagers" (The passengers) was released in 2012.

Berry also performed the vocals to "Comment te dire adieu" (French version of "It Hurts To Say Goodbye") on the Blank & Jones CD Relax Edition Six, which was released in 2011.

Albums

2008 : Mademoiselle

 Mademoiselle
 Le Bonheur
 Las Vegas
 Belle comme tout
 Enfant de salaud
 Love Affair
 Plus loin
 Demain
 Inutile
 Chéri
 Les Heures bleues
 Mon automobile (Hidden Title)
 Nos équivoques (Deluxe Edition)
 La chanson d'Hélène with Daniel Darc (Deluxe Edition)
 Capri (Deluxe Edition)
 La tendresse (Deluxe Edition)

2012 : Les Passagers

 Si souvent
 Les passagers
 Non ne le dis plus
 Brune
 Les mouchoirs blancs
 Si c'est la vie
 Like a river
 Ce matin
 Claquer dans les doigts
 For ever
 Partir léger
 Voir du pays

Acting 
 2006: Le juge est une femme ("The Judge Is a Woman", TV Series, 1 episode)
 2004-2005: Les Cordier, juge et flic (TV Series, 3 episodes)
 2003: Commissaire Moulin (TV Series, 1 episode)

References

External links
 Berry, IMDb

1978 births
Living people
21st-century French singers
21st-century French women singers